JNJ-42165279 is a drug developed by Janssen Pharmaceutica which acts as a potent and selective inhibitor of the enzyme fatty acid amide hydrolase (FAAH), with an IC50 of 70 nM. It is described as a covalently binding but slowly reversible selective inhibitor of FAAH. JNJ-42165279 is being developed for the treatment of anxiety disorders and major depressive disorder. Clinical development has progressed as far as Phase II human trials with two studies in patients with mood disorders registered in ClinicalTrials.gov.

In early 2016, a trial with a different FAAH inhibitor — Bial's BIA 10-2474 — resulted in a series of severe adverse events, including a death. In response, Janssen announced that it was temporarily suspending dosing in its two Phase II clinical trials with JNJ-42165279, describing the decision as "precautionary measure follows safety issue with different drug in class". Janssen was emphatic that no serious adverse events had been reported in any of the clinical trials with JNJ-42165279 to date. The suspension is to remain in effect until more information is available about the BIA 10-2474 study.
As of 2018, the trials had resumed.

See also 
 List of investigational anxiolytics
 LY-2183240
 URB-597
 PF-3845
 BIA 10-2474

References 

Cannabinoids
Enzyme inhibitors
Benzodioxoles
Ureas
Chloropyridines
Organofluorides